The men's road race at the 1998 UCI Road World Championships was held on Sunday October 11, 1998, in Valkenburg, Netherlands, over a total distance of 258 kilometres (15 laps). There were a total number of 153 starters, with 66 cyclists finishing the race.

Lance Armstrong's fourth-place finish was stripped by USADA in 2012 due to doping.

Final classification

Non-finishers

Did not finish

Did not start

References

External sources
Results

Men's Road Race
UCI Road World Championships – Men's road race